The Coastal Heritage Greenway is a greenway in the U.S. state of Delaware linking many sites along the Delaware Bay and the Atlantic Ocean between Fox Point State Park in Edgemoor, New Castle County and the beach town of Fenwick Island in Sussex County. The greenway follows Delaware Route 9 from the Wilmington area to just south of Dover and Delaware Route 1 from Dover to Fenwick Island.

Points of interest

Sussex County
Fenwick Island
Fenwick Island State Park
Bethany Beach
Delaware Seashore State Park
Dewey Beach
Rehoboth Beach
Cape Henlopen State Park
Lewes
Beach Plum Island Nature Preserve
Prime Hook National Wildlife Refuge
Mispillion Light

Kent County
Barratt's Chapel
John Dickinson Plantation
Little Creek Wildlife Area
Port Mahon
Leipsic
Bombay Hook National Wildlife Refuge
Allee House
Woodland Beach
Woodland Beach Wildlife Area

New Castle County
Flemings Landing
Collins Beach
Taylor's Bridge
Odessa
Silver Run
Augustine Beach
Port Penn
Thousand Acre Marsh
Delaware City
Dragon Run
Red Lion Creek
New Castle
Fox Point State Park

Side trips
The greenway features side trips to the following cities and towns:
Milton
Milford
Dover

References

External links
Coastal Heritage Greenway Auto Tour at Delaware State Parks 

Geography of Delaware